Xu Zhiqiang (Chinese: 许志强) (born 4 March 1963) is a former male Chinese gymnast.

Xu was born in Guangzhou, Guangdong Province. He joined the People's Liberation Army in 1973, and enrolled in the army's gymnastics team. Later Xu was admitted into Chinese national team. Xu competed at 1984 Olympic Games, and helped China win a silver medal in men's gymnastics team competition.  He also competed at the 1988 Summer Olympics, but did not win a medal.

References

1963 births
Chinese male artistic gymnasts
Olympic silver medalists for China
Living people
Olympic medalists in gymnastics
Asian Games medalists in gymnastics
Gymnasts at the 1986 Asian Games
Medalists at the World Artistic Gymnastics Championships
Asian Games gold medalists for China
Medalists at the 1986 Asian Games
Olympic gymnasts of China
Gymnasts at the 1984 Summer Olympics
Gymnasts at the 1988 Summer Olympics
Gymnasts from Guangzhou
Medalists at the 1984 Summer Olympics
20th-century Chinese people